Fear and the Nervous System is the first and only album by American rock band Fear and the Nervous System, released on September 18, 2012.

Background 
The project began in 2008 led by Korn guitarist James "Munky" Shaffer, who began writing for the band after the death of his father. In early 2008 he started gathering musicians for his project, starting with drummer Brooks Wackerman of Bad Religion and various other projects, followed by Korn's touring keyboardist Zac Baird, Faith No More bassist Billy Gould, and io echo guitarist Leopold Ross. After recording the music, Shaffer introduced producer Ross Robinson to the band's music, who contacted Steve Krolikowski of Repeater to provide vocals.

The first single, "Choking Victim", was released on June 29, 2011, as a free download from the band's website. Shaffer said of the song, "It's a good representation of what people will hear, and it's about something that happens to all of us. You trust somebody, give them your heart, and they turn around and stab you in the back. I think everybody can relate to that."

Track listing

Band members 
Musicians
James Christian Shaffer – guitars
Steve Krolikowski – vocals
Leopold Ross – guitars, programming, production
Zac Baird – keyboard
Billy Gould – bass
Brooks Wackerman – drums

Other contributors
Wes Borland – album artwork
Tim Harkins – production
Danny Lohner – production
Jim Monti – mixing

References 

2012 debut albums
Fear and the Nervous System albums